KEDA (1540 kHz) is an AM radio station licensed to San Antonio, Texas, United States, the station serves the San Antonio area.  The station is currently owned by Claro Communications.

History
KEDA (1540 AM) founded on March 17, 1966, by Manuel G. Davila. KEDA is regarded by some as one of the first Tejano Music radio stations in the United States. Davila's first words on the opening day of his station were "KEDA está en el aire." From its founding KEDA committed to the goal of supporting the local tejano bands of San Antonio. This goal has been attributed by some to the lack of airtime given to Tejano bands in the 1960s. While the radio formats of stations usually change over time, KEDA's format has remained relatively unchanged since its inception.

In 2008, KEDA was the longest-running and last remaining family-owned independent radio station in the San Antonio market; along with playing music, it maintained a connection to its roots through community-service programming. These efforts included the reading of obituaries on the air as well as fundraisers for those who could not afford to bury their dead children.

In July 2011, Claro Communications (headed by Gerald Benavides) bought the radio station.Conjunto station's sale marks end of an era The format remains the same with much of KEDA's previous air staff still working there.

On March 17, 2014, KEDA went into the FM spectrum at 87.7 FM.About – KEDA FM

Manuel G. Davila
Manuel G. Davila Sr. died on July 12, 1997. Leaving the station to his wife and children. His youngest son, Albert Davila was Program Director of KEDA until 2011.

Davila was indicted into the Texas Conjunto Music Hall of Fame in 2015.

References

External links

EDA
1966 establishments in Texas
Radio stations established in 1966
Tejano music